Ben Shattuck (born 1984) is an American writer, painter, and curator. His memoir Six Walks from Tin House was named an editor's pick by The Rumpus and "must-read book" by Town & Country. For his short fiction he won a PEN/Robert J. Dau Short Story Prize from Pen America, a Pushcart Prize, and a Bread Loaf scholarship. His short story set in World War I "The History of Sound" is being turned into a feature film by Oliver Hermanus starring Paul Mescal and Josh O'Connor.

Early life and education 
Shattuck was born and raised in Dartmouth, Massachusetts and lived by the sea. His parents, who met in New York, both work in the arts in Massachusetts; his mother, Dedee, owns an art gallery, while his father, Bill, is a painter. Shattuck attended Deerfield Academy for high school, Cornell University for college, and the Iowa Writers' Workshop for his Master's of Fine Arts in fiction. He taught fiction writing while at the University of Iowa as a graduate teaching assistant, and then at Victoria University of Wellington.

Career 
Shattuck's first book Six Walks received a starred review from Publishers Weekly, a positive review from Kirkus Reviews, and praise from Bill McKibben, Nick Offerman, Hernan Diaz, Karen Thompson Walker, and Nathaniel Philbrick. The memoir tracks the author's retracing of six walks taken by Henry David Thoreau, which brings about personal memories and emotional insights.

He currently serves as the director and curator of Dedee Shattuck Gallery, which is owned by and named after his mother. He also continues to paint, exhibiting in galleries including the Sloane Merrill Gallery in Boston and the Greylock Gallery in Willamstown. Shattuck has a brother named Will and in 2021, they bought the general store in their hometown, Davolls General Store, which was originally built in 1793.

Short stories and essays by Shattuck have been published in The Rumpus, The New Republic, The Paris Review, Salon.com, McSweeney's, and Literary Hub. His essay "There Once Was a Dildo in Nantucket" was Literary Hub's fifth most read story in 2015. His 2016 short story from Harvard Review, "Edwin Chase of Nantucket," won an award for debut authors from Pen America. In an interview with Catapult, Shattuck said he started the story in 2013. It was his first published short story. 

His 2018 story "The History of Sound" from The Common was published in the Pushcart Prize anthology, and is being adapted to film and distributed through End Cue, Embankment Films, and Film4. In 2021, Oliver Hermanus said of his decision to adapt the story and direct the film: "I instantly fell in love with Ben Shattuck’s flawlessly beautiful short story and knew I had to be involved in its journey to the screen." When the casting was revealed as two romantic leads played by Emmy winner Josh O'Connor and BAFTA winner Paul Mescal, there was controversy about whether two straight actors should play gay characters. Filming for the movie is schedule for summer 2022 in the U.S., UK, and Italy.

His second book, a short story collection with the same title, The History of Sound, is set in New England across multiple centuries and will be published with an imprint of Viking Press.

Personal life 
In 2019, Shattuck lived with girlfriend Jenny Slate in Massachusetts, where she was also born and raised. They got engaged after Shattuck proposed during a picnic at a French castle later that year. Their daughter was born in late 2020. Their wedding was postponed three times due to the COVID-19 pandemic, and they married in their living room on December 31, 2021.

Shattuck knows how to play the banjo, and he goes birdwatching. Has written accounts of losing the tip of his middle finger on his dominant left hand while crossing ice carrying a boat, and inviting a paranormal team to investigate his grandmother's house.

References

1984 births
21st-century American male writers
Living people
21st-century American memoirists
21st-century American short story writers
American male non-fiction writers
American male short story writers
American memoirists
Cornell University alumni